The 2022–23 season is Fortis FC's 3rd season since its establishment in 2020 and their 1st season in the Bangladesh Premier League. They achieved promotion to the Bangladesh Premier league after being crowned the 2021–22 Bangladesh Championship League title. In addition to domestic league, Fortis FC will participate on this season's edition of Federation Cup and Independence Cup. The season covering period from 13 November 2022 to July 2023.

Overview

August
On 4 August 2022, Fortis secured the signing of Brazilian defender Danilo Quipapá from Bangladesh Police FC.     

In preparation for the club’s first season at the top-tier, Fortis tied in several experienced players from the top-flight as, ex-national team captain Mamunul Islam and forward Shakhawat Rony joined from Rahmatganj MFS and Chittagong Abahani Limited respectively, while Sheikh Jamal DC's goalkeeper Mitul Marma and defender Mojammel Hossain Nira joined the club, on 7 August. 

Within a span of two days, the club completed a trio of signings Sabuz Hossain and Kawsar Ali Rabbi joining, on 9 August, along with them Bangladesh U20 defender Shahin Mia joined from Saif Sporting Club after impressing at the 2022 SAFF U-20 Championship.

On 22 August, Fortis ended their transfer business for the month by capturing experienced defender Ariful Islam Jitu from Sheikh Jamal DC.

September

October

Players

Pre-season friendly

Transfers

Transfers in

Transfers out

Competitions

Overall

Overview

Premier League

Results summary

Results by round

Matches

Federation Cup

Group stage

Independence Cup

Group stage

Statistics

Squad statistics

Goalscorers

Source: Matches

References

Bangladeshi football club records and statistics
2022 in Bangladeshi football
2023 in Bangladeshi football
Sport in Dhaka